Wazobia FM 94.1 is a Nigerian Pidgin English radio station in Port Harcourt, Rivers State. It was founded in 2007 and belongs to Globe Communications Limited.

Renowned for its humorous approach to broadcasting, the station airs a mixture of news, features, sport, music (from popular Nigerian music, hip hop, highlife to world music and reggae), talk shows, topical issues and interviews.

Shows
Go Slow Yarn
Coolele Zone
Oga Madam
Wake Up Show

Presenters
Akas Baba
Ehidiana
Lolo 1
OPJ
Jeta
Porico
Smart Don
Benten
Omo Talk
Pickin
Igho Williams
Gbenga

See also

List of radio stations in Port Harcourt
Media of Nigeria

References

External links

Radio stations established in 2007
Radio stations in Port Harcourt
Privately held companies of Nigeria
Companies based in Port Harcourt
World music radio stations
2007 establishments in Nigeria
Wazobia FM